Echinocups is an extinct genus of Ommatine beetle. It was created in 2020 to house three species originally assigned to Notocupes, E. denticollis, E. neli and E. ohmkuhnlei The genus name refers to the sharp spikes present on the elytra. All three species are known from the Cenomanian aged Burmese amber of Myanmar.

References

Burmese amber
Ommatidae
Fossil taxa described in 2020
Prehistoric beetle genera